The Bridge of Light is an album by Apocalypse, recorded live in concert. The album is divided in 2 acts. The Act I is composed by individual songs and the Act II tells the story of a boy trying to find answers about himself in an abandoned park in the Christmas day. Eloy Fritsch plays keyboards including analog synths and Hammond organs. His brother Ruy plays guitar. Singer Gustavo Demarchi also plays flute.  The guest violin player is Hique Gomez.

Track listing

 Next Revelation
 Dreamer
 Ocean Soul
 Last Paradise
 The Dance of Down
 Meet Me
 Wake Up Call...
 ...To Madeleine
 Escape
 Welcome Outside
 Meeting Me Earthcrubbs
 Follow The Bridge
 Not Like You

Musicians

 Eloy Fritsch: Electronic keyboards, Organ, Minimoog, vocals
 Ruy Fritsch: Electric and acoustic guitars, vocals
 Chico Fasoli: Drums, percussion, vocals
 Gustavo Demarchi: Lead Vocal, flute
 Magoo Wise: Bass guitar
 Hique Gomez: Violin, vocals

References

2008 live albums
Apocalypse (band) albums
Concept albums